The , also known as the Shimokamo Tropical Garden, are botanical gardens located at Shimokamo Spa, 255 Shimokamo, Minami Izu-cho, Kamo, Shizuoka, Japan.

The garden contains about 2,000 species of tropical plants, including banana, bougainvillea, papaya, and pineapple.

See also 
 List of botanical gardens in Japan

References 
 Shimokamo Tropical Botanical Gardens (Japanese)
 Photographs and description (Japanese)
 Japanese National Tourist Organization: Izu Peninsula

Botanical gardens in Japan
Gardens in Shizuoka Prefecture
Minamiizu, Shizuoka